The 1994 Superclub competition was the second season of a nationwide association football club competition in New Zealand. It was won by North Shore United.

Structure
The competition was divided into three stages. In the first phase three ten-team regional round-robin leagues were played, with each team playing every other team home and away. The top teams from this stage progressed to a national league; the bottom teams were relegated to lower regional leagues.

The top eight teams (three from the northern and central regions and two from the southern region) then took part in the national league stage, with each team playing every other team once. Finally, the top four teams played a knock-out competition to decide the champion. This involved the top two teams from the national league phase playing each other, and third and fourth place also playing each other. The winner of the match between first and second progressed through to the final; the loser of that match met the winner of the other match to decide the other finalist.

No team was relegated from the Central regional league after the 1994 season, so eleven teams took part in 1995.

Regional leagues

Northern League

Central League

Southern League

National League

League table

Knockout phase

Playoffs

Final

Records and statistics
Player of the Year
Darren McClennan (Waitakere City)
Coach of the Year
Keith Pritchett (Waitakere City)
Player's Choice Player of the Year
Neil Woodhams (Waitakere City)
Young Player of the Year
Ivan Vicelich (Waitakere City)

References

New Zealand Superclub League seasons
1
New Zealand